Campese may refer to:

 David Campese (born 1962), rugby union player
 Marco Campese (born 1980), football midfielder
 Mike Campese, guitarist  and composer
 Terry Campese (born 1984), rugby league player
 Campese is also a dialectal variant of Ribagorçan, an Aragonese language spoken in Campo, a town in the Spanish Pyrenees.